"Under Fire" is a missing episode in the British comedy series Dad's Army. It was originally transmitted on Saturday 5 April 1969. One of the three missing Dad's Army episodes, the videotape was wiped for reuse. The last episode of series 2, it was the final Dad's Army episode to be recorded in black and white.

Plot
The platoon arrest a suspect agent, who insists on being a British citizen, despite his accent, and the fact that he has a dog called Fritz. He attempts to help them put out a fire in the church hall, and is then found to be Warden Hodges' uncle. He comments that he doesn't know how Britain will win the war, and Wilson agrees.

Cast

Arthur Lowe as Captain Mainwaring
John Le Mesurier as Sergeant Wilson
Clive Dunn as Lance Corporal Jones
John Laurie as Private Frazer
James Beck as Private Walker
Arnold Ridley as Private Godfrey
Ian Lavender as Private Pike
Geoffrey Lumsden as Corporal-Colonel Square
Janet Davies as Mavis Pike
John Ringham as Captain Bailey
Queenie Watts as Mrs Keen
Gladys Dawson as Mrs Witt
Ernst Ulman as Sigmund Murphy
Bill Pertwee as ARP Warden Hodges
June Peterson as the woman

Remake

Kevin McNally as Captain Mainwaring
Robert Bathurst as Sergeant Wilson
Kevin Eldon as Lance Corporal Jones
David Hayman as Private Frazer
Mathew Horne as Private Walker
Timothy West as Private Godfrey
Tom Rosenthal as Private Pike
David Horovitch as Corporal-Colonel Square
Tracy-Ann Oberman as Mavis Pike
William Andrews as Captain Bailey
Tamzin Griffin as Mrs Keen
Thelma Ruby as Mrs Witt
Philip Pope as Sigmund Murphy
Simon Ludders as ARP Warden Hodges
Joann Condon as the woman

Notes
Known as one of the three missing Dad's Army episodes, after the tape was wiped by the BBC for reuse. The other two are The Loneliness of the Long Distance Walker and A Stripe for Frazer.
Before being wiped, the episode was repeated on 29 August 1969.
Gold commissioned recreations of all three missing episodes. The remake of this episode was first broadcast on 27 August 2019.

Radio Episode
The radio episode still exists. It was Episode 11 for the 1st radio series.

Further reading

External links

Dad's Army radio episodes
Dad's Army missing episodes
Dad's Army (series 2) episodes
1969 British television episodes